Howard Thomas Sheppeard (born 31 January 1933) was a Welsh professional footballer who played as an inside forward for Sunderland.

References

1933 births
People from Ynysybwl
Sportspeople from Rhondda Cynon Taf
Welsh footballers
Association football inside forwards
Sunderland A.F.C. players
Cardiff City F.C. players
Newport County A.F.C. players
Abergavenny Thursdays F.C. players
English Football League players
Living people